Taxis, buses, and personal automobiles are the most common ways to travel in Aruba. The majority of the roads are paved, but toward the interior of the island the roads are less commonly paved. Coastal areas most often feature paved roads. With a total of 800 km of road, 287 km are unpaved.

Overview
Arubus is the government-owned bus company with some 29 buses in service. Mini-buses are also common. The main Arubus station is located in downtown Oranjestad.

Despite Aruba's location near Curaçao and Venezuela, boat crossings are not generally available. Private boaters can make the journey, but there is no public transport via the sea. Travelers may choose to take short plane flights from the Queen Beatrix International Airport.

There are three ports or harbors on the island: Barcadera, Oranjestad, and San Nicolas. The Aruba Ports Authority operates the ports in Barcadera and Oranjestad, while the Valero Aruba Refining Company operates the third port. Barcadera and San Nicolaas are mainly industrial and oil ports.

Rental car companies Hertz, Avis, and Alamo have locations at Queen Beatrix International Airport.  Local rental car companies are also available.  Arubans drive on the right side of the road, so that an American tourist will have little problem adjusting to the driving pattern.

Railways

There were, historically, three industrial narrow-gauge railways; but they no longer exist. One was for the guano mines in Seroe Colorado, and two were for the oil refineries of Lago Oil and Transport Company (ExxonMobil) and Arend Petroleum Maatschappij (Royal Dutch Shell).

In 2012 a tramway line was inaugurated in Downtown Oranjestad.

See also
Aruba

References

External links